Zindagi Khoobsoorat Hai  is a 2002 Indian film produced by Manjeet Maan and directed by Manoj Punj. It stars Gurdas Maan, Tabu, Divya Dutta and Rajat Kapoor.

Cast

Music 

Anand Raj Anand and a new music director, Hemant Prashar, composed the music and the playback singers are Gurdas Maan, Alka Yagnik, Sunidhi Chauhan, Sonu Nigam, Anand Raj Anand, Udit Narayan, Mohammad Aziz and Manpreet. Nida Fazli and Dev Kohli penned the lyrics.

Soundtrack

Awards 
Udit Narayan won National Film Award for Best Male Playback Singer.

See also 
Shaheed-E-Mohabbat
Des Hoyaa Pardes
Waris Shah: Ishq Daa Waaris

References

External links 

Films scored by Anand Raj Anand
2000s Hindi-language films
2000s Punjabi-language films